Simone Smith may refer to:

Simone Smith (British film editor), Scottish film director and film editor
Simone Smith (Canadian film editor), Canadian film and television editor
Simone Smith (rugby league) (born 1993), Australian rugby league player